Matsqui Island is a large island in the Fraser River in the Central Fraser Valley region of British Columbia, Canada. Though technically located within the District of Mission, Matsqui Island and adjoining sandbars are part of the Matsqui Indian Reserve and are governed by the Matsqui First Nation.

See also
Matsqui, British Columbia

References

Islands of the Fraser River
Islands of British Columbia
Abbotsford, British Columbia
Mission, British Columbia
Landforms of Lower Mainland